Carex nervina is a species of sedge known by the common name Sierra sedge.

Distribution
This sedge is native to California, including the Sierra Nevada and San Joaquin Valley, and adjacent parts of Oregon and Nevada, where it grows mainly in mountain meadows.

Description
Carex nervina forms thick clumps of spongy, winged stems up to about 70 centimeters tall. The inflorescence is a dense cluster of a few compact spikes up to 3 centimeters long. The fruit is coated in a shiny green or brown toothed perigynium.

External links
Jepson Manual Treatment - Carex nervina
Carex nervina - Photo gallery

nervina
Flora of California
Flora of Nevada
Flora of Oregon
Flora of the Sierra Nevada (United States)
Natural history of the Central Valley (California)
Plants described in 1885
Flora without expected TNC conservation status
Taxa named by Liberty Hyde Bailey